Eutreta longicornis is a species of tephritid or fruit flies in the genus Eutreta of the family Tephritidae.

Distribution
United States, Canada.

References

Tephritinae
Insects described in 1894
Diptera of North America